Shahrak Emam Khomeyni (also Romanized as Shahraḵ Emām Khomeynī) is a village in Kuhdasht-e Jonubi Rural District, in the Central District of Kuhdasht County, Lorestan Province, Iran. At the 2006 census, its population was 768, in 165 families.

References 

Towns and villages in Kuhdasht County